Merlyn Dawson (born 5 April 1960) is a Belizean former cyclist. He competed in the team time trial event at the 1984 Summer Olympics.

References

External links
 

1960 births
Living people
Belizean male cyclists
Olympic cyclists of Belize
Cyclists at the 1984 Summer Olympics
Place of birth missing (living people)